Connecticut's 34th State Senate district elects one member of the Connecticut State Senate. It consists of the towns of Wallingford, North Haven, and parts of East Haven, Durham, and North Branford. It has been represented by Republican Paul Cicarella since 2021.

Recent elections

2020

2018

2016

2014

2012

References

34